Atta Jaber (born 3 October 1994) is an Israeli footballer who plays as a defensive midfielder for Azerbaijan Premier League club Neftçi PFK.

Early life
Jaber was born in Majd al-Krum, Israel, to a Muslim-Arab family.

Club career statistics
 As to 9 November 2014

Honours

Club
Maccabi Haifa
Israel State Cup (1): 2015–16

References

 https://web.archive.org/web/20160304192539/http://maccabi-haifafc.walla.co.il/?w=%2F4796%2F%40entity

1994 births
Living people
Footballers from Majd al-Krum
Israeli footballers
Israel under-21 international footballers
Arab citizens of Israel
Arab-Israeli footballers
Maccabi Haifa F.C. players
Bnei Sakhnin F.C. players
F.C. Ashdod players
Neftçi PFK players
Israeli Premier League players
Liga Leumit players
Azerbaijan Premier League players
Israeli expatriate footballers
Expatriate footballers in Azerbaijan
Israeli expatriate sportspeople in Azerbaijan
Association football midfielders
Israeli Muslims